Abdulla Gadimbayli (born 2 January 2002) is an Azerbaijani chess grandmaster (2022). He was the winner of the Azerbaijani Chess Championship in 2018.

Biography
Abdulla Gadimbayli repeatedly represented Azerbaijan at the European Youth Chess Championships and World Youth Chess Championships in different age groups, where he won three gold medals: in 2009, at the European Youth Chess Championship in the U08 age group, and in 2010, at the European and World Youth Chess Championships in the U08 age group. In 2016, he played for Azerbaijan in World Youth U16 Chess Olympiad.

In 2018, Abdulla Gadimbayli won Azerbaijani Chess Championship.

Abdulla Gadimbayli played for Azerbaijan-3 team in the Chess Olympiad:
 In 2016, at third board in the 42nd Chess Olympiad in Baku (+4, =3, -2).

In 2017, he was awarded the FIDE International Master (IM) title.

In 2022, he won the World Junior Chess Championship on tiebreaks, with a score of 8/11 (+5, =6, -0), making him eligible for the Grandmaster (GM) title.

References

External links

Abdulla Gadimbayli chess games at 365Chess.com

2002 births
Living people
Azerbaijani chess players
Chess Olympiad competitors
Chess International Masters